Franz Schubert's Piano Sonata in A-flat major  557 was composed in May 1817.

Movements
The work is relatively short and a performance takes somewhat between 10 and 15 minutes. The sonata is cheerful and uncomplicated, and carries remembrances of Mozart and the Baroque era.

I. Allegro moderato  A-flat major
The beginning resembles the opening of the menuetto, D. 380, Nr. 3.
II. Andante  E-flat major
III. Allegro  E-flat major
This movement has a dance-like character.

The fact that the last movement is in the key of E-flat major rather than the tonic key of A-flat major is evidence in favor of Schubert possibly intending to add a fourth movement, although the extant third movement has much of the character of a finale. At the time this was written it was quite unusual to end a composition in another key than its tonic, however Schubert did do this in some of his early works, e.g. D. 553 ("Auf der Donau", beginning in E-flat major and ending in F-sharp minor).

Score
The sonata was first published in 1888, in the Breitkopf & Härtel complete edition.

Manuscripts
The autograph of the sonata, dated May 1817, is incomplete — it stops at the 28th measure of the third movement, but there is a contemporary complete manuscript.

First publication — Alte Gesammtausgabe (AGA)
D. 557 was first published in 1888 as No. 3 of the Piano Sonatas volume (Series X) of the Kritisch durchgesehene Gesammtausgabe.

Urtext Editions
Both Paul Badura-Skoda (Henle) and Martino Tirimo (Wiener Urtext) published an Urtext edition in 1997.

Neue Schubert-Ausgabe (NSA)
In the New Schubert Edition D. 557 is given in VII/2/1.

References

Sources
Franz Schubert's Werke: Kritisch durchgesehene Gesammtausgabe (AGA): Leipzig, Breitkopf & Härtel:
Julius Epstein (ed.) Serie 10: Sonaten für Pianoforte — No. 3 (1888).
Urtext editions:
Paul Badura-Skoda (ed.) Franz Schubert: Piano Sonatas — Volume III (Early and Unfinished Sonatas). G. Henle Verlag (1997).
Martino Tirimo (ed.) Schubert: The Complete Piano Sonatas — Volume 1 Vienna: Wiener Urtext Edition (1997). ISMN 979-0-50057-223-7 
Franz Schubert: Neue Ausgabe sämtlicher Werke (NSA): Kassel, Bärenreiter:
Otto Erich Deutsch.  Series VIII: Supplement — Volume 4: Franz Schubert, thematisches Verzeichnis seiner Werke in chronologischer Folge — pp. 323-324 (1978). ISMN 9790006305148 — 
Walburga Litschauer (ed.) Series VII: Piano Music, Part 2: Works for Piano Two Hands — Volume 1: Klaviersonaten I'' (2000). ISMN 9790006497119

External links
 VII,2/1: Klaviersonaten I at the Neue Schubert-Ausgabe website

1817 compositions
Piano sonatas by Franz Schubert
Compositions in A-flat major